The New Mexico spadefoot toad (Spea multiplicata) is a species of American spadefoot toad found in the southwestern United States and Mexico. Like other species of spadefoot toad, they get their name from a distinctive spade-like projections on their hind legs which enable them to dig in sandy soils. Spea multiplicata can be identified by its wedge-shaped spade. Some sources also refer to the species as the Mexican spadefoot toad, desert spadefoot toad or southern spadefoot toad.

Description 

The New Mexico spadefoot toad grows from 1.5 to 2.5 inches in length, and has a round body, with relatively short legs. They are green, to grey, to brown, usually reflecting  the soil color of their native habitat, often with black and orange colored speckling on their back, and a white underside. They have large eyes, with vertical pupils.

Behavior 

Like all species of spadefoot toad, the New Mexico spadefoot toad is nocturnal and secretive. If handled, these frogs might emit a peanutlike odor, which can cause tearing and nasal discharge if in close contact with the face. Spending most of its time buried in the ground, the spadefoot emerges during periods of summer rainfall to feed on insects and to breed. Breeding takes place in temporary pools left by the rain. Eggs laid in large masses, often hatch in as little as 48 hours. The tadpoles are forced to metamorphose quickly, before the water dries up. S. multiplicata tadpoles exhibit phenotypic plasticity. Tadpoles that ingest fairy shrimp, when present, may express a novel carnivore phenotype. This novel phenotype increases the rate of development, helping the tadpoles to escape drying ponds more rapidly.

Taxonomy 

The species was once classified as a subspecies of the western spadefoot toad, Spea hammondii, but distinctive morphological characteristics led researchers to reclassify it as its own species. The New Mexico spadefoot toad is also known to hybridize with the Plains spadefoot toad, Spea bombifrons in the areas where their ranges overlap, making distinguishing the species from each other difficult.

Trivia 

The New Mexico spadefoot toad was designated as the official State Amphibian of New Mexico in 2003.

References 

Herps of Texas: Spea multiplicata
Amphibian Species of the World: Spea multiplicata
Peterson Field Guide - Western Reptiles and Amphibians 3rd Edition

External links 

 
 

Spea
amphibians of Mexico
amphibians of the United States
fauna of Northern Mexico
fauna of the Southwestern United States
biota of New Mexico
symbols of New Mexico
amphibians described in 1863